Travnik Oblast was one of the oblasts of the Kingdom of Serbs, Croats and Slovenes from 1922 to 1929. Its administrative center was Travnik.

History 
The Kingdom of Serbs, Croats and Slovenes was formed in 1918 and was initially divided into counties and districts (this division was inherited from previous state administrations). In 1922, new administrative units known as oblasts (Serbo-Croatian: oblasti / области) were introduced and the whole country was divided into 33 oblasts. Before 1922, the territory of the Travnik Oblast was primarily part of the Travnik District.

In 1929, the 33 oblasts were administratively replaced with 9 banovinas and one district, and the territory of the Travnik Oblast was administratively split between the Vrbas Banovina and the Littoral Banovina.

Geography 
The Travnik Oblast was mostly congruent with the region with Tropolje. It shared borders with the Sarajevo Oblast in the west, Split Oblast in the east, the Mostar Oblast in the south, the Bihać and Vrbas Oblasts in the north, the Tuzla Oblast in the north-east, and the Primorje-Krajina Oblast in the north-west.

Demographics 
According to 1921 census, the Travnik Oblast was linguistically dominated by speakers of Serbo-Croatian.

Cities and towns 
The main cities and towns located within the oblast were:

 Travnik
 Zenica
 Žepče
 Bugojno
 Prozor
 Županjac
 Livno
 Glamoč
 Jajce

All mentioned cities and towns are now part of Bosnia and Herzegovina

See also 

 Travnik
 Kingdom of Serbs, Croats and Slovenes

References

Further reading 

 Istorijski atlas, Geokarta, Beograd, 1999.
 Istorijski atlas, Intersistem kartografija, Beograd, 2010.

History of Travnik
History of Tropolje
Yugoslav Bosnia and Herzegovina
20th century in Bosnia and Herzegovina
Oblasts of the Kingdom of Serbs, Croats and Slovenes